The XV World Rhythmic Gymnastics Championships were held in Piraeus, Greece, at Peace and Friendship Stadium, on October 9–13, 1991.

Individual

All-around

Rope

Hoop

Ball

Clubs

Team

Group

All-around

Exercise 6 ribbons

Exercise 3 ropes + 3 balls

References

FIG - Event status
FIG - Official results 
RSG http://rsg.net/cgi-bin/show?events/1991/wm_athen_91.html

Rhythmic Gymnastics World Championships
R
W
World Rhythmic Gymnastics Championships
G
Sports competitions in Athens